Ambada Njaane! is a 1985 Indian Malayalam-language film, directed by  Antony Eastman and produced by M.S.Ravi for Ramya Productions. The film stars Shankar, Menaka,   Nedumudi Venu, Thilakan and KPAC Lalitha in lead roles.

Cast

Shankar as Kutti Krishnan
Menaka as Devayani
Nedumudi Venu Kutty Krishnan's grandfather 
Thilakan as Padmanabhan aka Pappan 
KPAC Lalitha as Ammini, Kutty Krishnan' mother 
Lalu Alex as Peethambaran
Kunchan as Arjunan, Devayani's brother 
Paravoor Bharathan

References

External links
 

1985 films
1980s Malayalam-language films